The 2016–17 Kategoria Superiore was the 78th official season, or 81st season of top-tier football in Albania (including three unofficial championships during World War II) and the 17th season under the name Kategoria Superiore. Skënderbeu were the defending champions. The season began on 7 September 2016 and concluded on 27 May 2017.

On 20 May 2017, Kukësi defeated the reigning champions Skënderbeu 2–0 to clinch their first-ever league title, in only their fifth season in the top-flight.

Teams

Changes
Ten teams competed in the league – the top eight teams from the previous season, as well as two teams promoted from the Kategoria e Parë. Korabi defeated Ada 1–0 at the Reshit Rusi Stadium on the final matchday of the regular season in Group A of the Kategoria e Parë to secure promotion to the Kategoria Superiore after a 54-year absence. Luftëtari were then promoted back to Albanian Superliga after a three-year absence as they defeated Apolonia Fier on the final matchday of the regular season in Group B of the Kategoria e Parë. The two promoted clubs replace Bylis and Tërbuni.

Locations

Stadiums

League table

Results
Each team plays every opponent four times, twice at home and twice away, for a total of 36 games.

First half of season

Second half of season

Positions by round
The table lists the positions of teams after each week of matches.

Season statistics

Scoring

Top scorers

Hat-tricks

Note
4 Player scored 4 goals

Clean sheets

Discipline

Player

Most yellow cards: 12
Alfred Zefi (Korabi)
Vangjel Zguro (Lufëtari)

Most red cards: 2 
Arjan Sheta (Korabi)
Entonio Pashaj (Kukësi)
Stefan Cicmil (Vllaznia)
Erjon Vucaj (Tirana/Laçi)

Club

Most yellow cards: 104
Luftëtari

Most red cards: 7
Luftëtari 
Korabi

References

External links
 
Superliga at uefa.com
Livescore

2016-17
2016–17 in European association football leagues
1